Theresa Helburn (January 12, 1887 – August 18, 1959) was an American playwright and theatrical producer best known for her work as a co-founder and producer of New York's Theatre Guild from 1919 to the 1950s.

Early life

Helburn was born in New York City to Julius Helburn, a leather merchant, and Hannah née Peyser, who established her own experimental elementary school. She attended the Horace Mann School and Windsor School in Boston before graduating from Bryn Mawr College in 1908. There she was active in theatre. She then studied playwriting at Radcliffe College and at the Sorbonne. She then taught theatre and wrote drama criticism. By 1918, the first of her own plays was produced on Broadway.

Theatre Guild and later years

Helburn was a co-founder of the Theatre Guild in 1919. There she acted first as a literary manager, reviewing scripts, then as casting director, and later became co-producer with Lawrence Langner. The Guild brought original dramas from European and American playwrights, such as George Bernard Shaw and Eugene O'Neill, to the Broadway stage, and established relationships with such notable actors as Alfred Lunt and Lynn Fontanne, whom Helburn cast together for the first time in 1924. She married scholar John Baker Opdycke in 1922.  In 1925, just six years after the establishment of the production company, Helburn presided over the groundbreaking ceremony for the new Guild Theatre (now August Wilson Theatre). She also supported new plays and playwrights in smaller theatres.
Some of Helburn's Broadway productions in the 1930s included Mourning Becomes Electra (1931) and The Philadelphia Story (1939). In the early 1930s, she also worked briefly in Hollywood, and she maintained strong ties with the film and television industries until the time of her death. Later, for the Guild, she came up with the concept to turn the Guild's earlier production of Green Grow the Lilacs into a musical, which became Oklahoma! Likewise, the Guild had produced Liliom, which was later adapted as Carousel. Other important Broadway productions included The Iceman Cometh (1946), Come Back, Little Sheba (1950), Picnic (1953) and The Trip to Bountiful (1953).

Helburn died at age 72 in Norwalk, Connecticut. A collection of theatrical ephemera, photographs and writings relating to Helburn's life and to the Guild is housed at Bryn Mawr College. She wrote a memoir, A wayward quest. The autobiography of Theresa Helburn, published in 1960 by Little, Brown.

References

Sources
Nolan, Frederick. The Sound of Their Music: The Story of Rodgers and Hammerstein. New York: Applause Books, 2002,

External links

 
 
 Theresa Helburn Papers. Yale Collection of American Literature, Beinecke Rare Book and Manuscript Library.

1887 births
1959 deaths
American theatre directors
Women theatre directors
Bryn Mawr College alumni
Jewish American dramatists and playwrights